Waterloo Township may refer to:

Canada 

 Waterloo Township, Ontario, defunct; now Waterloo Region

United States 

 Waterloo Township, Fayette County, Indiana
 Waterloo Township, Allamakee County, Iowa
 Waterloo Township, Lyon County, Kansas
 Waterloo Township, Jackson County, Michigan
 Waterloo Township, Cavalier County, North Dakota, in Cavalier County, North Dakota
 Waterloo Township, Athens County, Ohio

See also 

Waterloo (disambiguation)

Township name disambiguation pages